Hyposmocoma mystodoxa is a species of moth of the family Cosmopterigidae. It was first described by Edward Meyrick in 1915. It is endemic to the Hawaiian island of Oahu. The type locality is the Koʻolau Range, near Honolulu.

External links

mystodoxa
Endemic moths of Hawaii
Biota of Oahu
Moths described in 1915